Ahaetulla perroteti, known commonly as the bronze-headed vine snake, Perrotet's vine snake, or the Western Ghats bronzeback, is a species of mildly venomous, rear-fanged snake in the family Colubridae. The species is endemic to the Western Ghats in South India.

Etymology
The specific name, perroteti, is in honor of French naturalist George Samuel Perrottet (1793–1867).

Description
See snake scales for terminology.
A. perroteti has the following characters. The snout is obtusely pointed and projecting, without dermal appendage, not quite twice as long as the eye. There is no loreal; the internasals and prefrontals are in contact with the labials. The frontal is longer than its distance from the end of the snout, as long as the parietals. There is one preocular, in contact with the frontal, and one postocular. The temporals are arranged 1+2 or 2+2. There are 8 (rarely 9) upper labials, the fourth and fifth entering the eye. The 4 lower labials are in contact with the anterior chin shields, which are as long as the posterior chin shields.

The dorsal scales are in 15 rows at midbody, and those on the sacral region are keeled. The ventrals number 138-140. The anal is divided, and the subcaudals number 70-82.

Males are bright green above, yellowish or pale green beneath, with a green lateral line. Females are drab brownish grey with a yellowish venter.

Distribution
A. perroteti is endemic to the Nilgiri Hills of the Western Ghats, in south India. It occurs in high-elevation hills, above , of Kerala and Tamil Nadu states. This species is known from the Upper Nilgiris, including Mukurthi National Park, Silent Valley and Vellarimala or Camel's Hump and Siruvani peak. Perhaps it has the smallest geographic range of all Indian Ahaetulla species.

Biology
A. perroteti is a diurnal, terrestrial snake found actively moving about on open montane grassland above the tree line. It feeds mainly on lizards and frogs. It is seen basking in full sunlight. It rarely if ever ascends trees.

Reproduction
A. perroteti is viviparous.

References

Further reading
Duméril AMC, Bibron G, Duméril AHA (1854). Erpétologie générale ou histoire naturelle complète des reptiles. Tome septième [Volume 7]. Deuxième partie, Comprenant l'histoire des serpents venimeux. Paris: Librairie Encyclopédique de Roret. xii + 781–1536. (Psammophis perroteti, new species, pp. 899–900). (in French).
Ganesh SR, Chandramouli SR (2011). "On the nomenclature and taxonomy of a south Indian colubrid snake Ahaetulla perroteti (Duméril, Bibron & Duméril, 1854)". Herpetological Bulletin (117): 19–24.
Smith MA (1943). The Fauna of British India, Ceylon and Burma, Including the Whole of the Indo-Chinese Sub-region. Reptilia and Amphibia. Vol. III.—Serpentes. London: Secretary of State for India. (Taylor and Francis, printers). xii + 583 pp. (Dryophis perroteti, p. 373).

Ahaetulla
Reptiles of India
Snakes of Asia
Endemic fauna of the Western Ghats
Taxa named by André Marie Constant Duméril
Taxa named by Auguste Duméril
Taxa named by Gabriel Bibron
Reptiles described in 1854